At least two ships of the French Navy have been named Arabe:

 , an  launched in 1917 and struck in 1936.
 , a  launched as USS Samuel. S. Miles and transferred to France in 1950. She was broken up in 1968.

French Navy ship names